The men's long jump event at the 2015 Asian Athletics Championships was held on June 3 and 4.

Medalists

Results

Qualification

Final

References

Long
Long jump at the Asian Athletics Championships